Hermann Friedrich Otto (born 30 July 1751 in Lockenhaus (Léka), Vas County, Kingdom of Hungary; died 2 November 1810 in Hechingen) was the ruling Prince of Hohenzollern-Hechingen from 1798 until 1810.

Life
Hermann succeeded his uncle Josef Friedrich Wilhelm as Prince in 1798. He was raised in Belgium, where his father, Prince Franz Xaver of Hohenzollern-Hechingen (1719–1765), was an imperial officer.  From his mother, Princess Anna Maria of Hoensbroech-Geulle ( 8 May 1729 – 26 September 1798), Prince Hermann inherited his Dutch holdings. 

His first spouse, Countess Louise of Merode-Westerloo, died after only one year of marriage. From his second wife, Princess Maximiliane of Gavre, Marquise d'Aysseau, he inherited one billion Francs. In 1779, Prince Hermann married his third wife, the Countess Maria Antonia of Waldburg-Zeil zu Wurzach.

After the transfer of the left bank of the Rhein to France as part of war reparations, he tried to find money for the beautification of Hechingen and the improvement of roads.  All of his activities served to increase the fortune of his House.

Prince Hermann was an Imperial-Field Marshal General and a Prussian Lieutenant General. The situation of the princedom between the time of the Second Congress of Rastatt and the end of the Empire, the Prince's debut was actually quite relaxed. Soon after his ascension to power, he held peace talks with the local land holders, and came to a mutual agreement June, 1795 in Hechingen with the local land holders. He then disbanded, the daily joyful homage festivals from a couple of free movements of all subjects of bondage. The village of Bisingen missed out on this because it would not enter into the agreement. In addition the village would not pay homage (since that time the Bisingers carry the nickname "Nichthuldiger“ meaning those who don’t pay homage.) The prince confined his hunts to three of his lands, outside of these lands, animals could be hunted by the peasants. The lands not within set borders were parceled out or sold. The serfdom, as far as legal dependents protected by the prince was concerned, was abolished. This weighed heavily upon them, however. The monarchy was appointed five percent of the estate.

The subjects obtained the right, in to appoint representatives by general election.  These representatives would have the right to control taxes and the right to make to represent the common people. The prince gave Jews, upon the suggestion of his Jewish adviser, Jakob Kaulla (see also Karoline Kaulla) permission to reside in his princedom for forty years in exchange for remuneration to the high chamber.  The prince succeeded in the settlement of the conflicts with his subjects within a few short weeks.

Prince Hermann was not generally a man of compromise, he was a bizarre personality, his nature was suspicious and that of a micro-manager; he concerned himself with the external details of administration.  He loved, according to the prevailing taste of the time, being alone in nature, particularly in his hunting lodge at Friedrichsthal. He was a businesslike, vigilant patriarch who managed to enjoy one last high point of princely absolutism.  The Confederation of the Rhine Acts rescued the independent existence of the Hechinger Princes, however he was in no way given an extension of power, neither based on landowner nor on rights of sovereignty. He perceived this as an affront and as discrimination against him, the eldest line of his House. Deeply afflicted by the humiliation of Prussia and Austria, Prince Hermann Friedrich Otto died on 2 November 1810.

Marriages and issue 
Prince Hermann Friedrich Otto was married three times. On  18 November 1773 he married Countess Louise of Merode-Westerloo
(* 28 September 1747; † 14 November 1774), the daughter of Jean Guillaume von Merode-Westerloo (1722–1763). He had one daughter with her:
 Luise Juliane Konstantine, (* 1 November 1774 in Maastricht; † 7 May 1846 in Glogau) ∞ 1806 Baron Ludwig Heer von der Burg (* 16 December 1776; † 13 October 1833)

On  15 February 1775 he married Princess Maximiliane of Gavre (* 30 March 1753; † 6 August 1778), daughter of Charles I Alexandre, 1st Prince de Gavre his second marriage. The couple had one son:
 Friedrich Hermann Otto, Prince of Hohenzollern-Hechingen (1776–1838) ∞ Princess Pauline Biron von Kurland, Princess of Sagan (1782–1845)

His third wife became the Princess Maria Antonia of Waldburg-Zeil zu Wurzach on  26 July 1779 (* 6 June 1753; † 25 October 1814). The couple bore the following children:

 Maria Antonia Philippine, (* 8 February 1781 in Dagstuhl; † 25 December 1831 The Hague) ∞ 12 July 1803 Count Friedrich Ludwig von Waldburg-Capustigall (* 25 October 1776; † 18 August 1844)
 Maria Theresia Franziska, (* 11 August 1784 in Dagstuhl; † 6 September 1784 in Dagstuhl)
 Franziska Theresia Karoline, (* 19 January 1786 in Dagstuhl; † 1810)
 Maria Maximiliane Antonie (* 3 November 1787 in Wadern; † 30 March 1865 Baden bei Wien);
 ∞ 25 February 1811 Count Eberhard von Waldburg-Wurzach (* 14 June 1778; † 18 January 1814)
 ∞ 12 June 1817 Klemens Josef Gf von Lodron-Laterano (* 23 September 1789; † + 3 September 1861)
 Josephine (* 14 May 1790 in Wadern; † 25 March 1856 in Vienna)
 ∞ 31 August 1811 Count Ladislaus Festetics de Tolna (* 15 June 1785; † 12 May 1846)

House of Hohenzollern-Hechingen
Princes of Hohenzollern-Hechingen
People from Oberpullendorf District
German expatriates in Hungary
German expatriates in Belgium
1751 births
1810 deaths